William Bealey Harrison  (16 January 1838 – 23 March 1912) was an English first-class cricketer, coal industrialist  and British Army officer.

The son of William Harrison, he was born at Norton Hall in Staffordshire in January 1838. He was educated at Rugby School. Harrison was commissioned in the Staffordshire Rifle Volunteer Corps as a lieutenant in February 1860. Shortly after he made two appearances in first-class cricket for the Gentlemen of the North against the Gentlemen of the South in 1861 at The Oval and 1862 at Nottingham. He was promoted to the rank of captain in April 1863, later resigning his commission in December 1873. He was in business in the coal mining industry in Walsall, in addition to being a member of the Mining Association of Great Britain for many years. Harrison served as the High Sheriff of Staffordshire in 1897. He died in March 1912 at Wall, Staffordshire. His son, William junior, was also a first-class cricketer.

References

External links

1838 births
1912 deaths
People from Cannock
People educated at Rugby School
English cricketers
Gentlemen of the North cricketers
British businesspeople in the coal industry
Deputy Lieutenants of Staffordshire
High Sheriffs of Staffordshire
English justices of the peace
19th-century British businesspeople